Martin May (born 21 April 1961) is a German actor best known for his portrayal as "Midshipman Ullmann" in the submarine war classic Das Boot as well as several years of voice acting, including voicing Diesel in the German dub of Thomas the Tank Engine & Friends.  His live action work after Das Boot included mostly German television films.

Filmography
The Wonderful Years (1979) - Stephan
Das Boot (1981) - Ullman
 (1983) - Andi
Der Sohn des Bullen (1984) - Tommi
Der Flieger (1986) - Bernd Klinger
 (1987) - 17 year old drug addicted
 (1988, TV series) - Jochen Bienger
Andy (1992)
Sex, Dogz and Rock n Roll (2011) - Mad B (voice)

External links
 
 Interview (in German)

1961 births
Living people
German male actors